Central Park is a former amusement park in the Rittersville section of Allentown, Pennsylvania. It was closed in 1951.

History
Central Park's origins date to 1868 when J. Frank Reichart laid out a race course north of the Allentown-Bethlehem turnpike (Hanover Avenue) which was opened for trotting and pacing from May to August. In 1872 the Rittersville Park Association was organized. The park was enlarged to 16 acres and was known as Manhattan Park.

When the Allentown & Bethlehem Rapid Traction Company took ownership of the area from Thomas Ritter it was called The Greater Central Park. Included in the park was a menagerie with quite a collection of animals, including elephants.

The park opened on July 2, 1893 as Rittersville Park, offering 40 acres of shady walks and ample park benches.  It was built in a wooded area with picnic groves, walking paths, a few amusements, theaters and food stands.  The first rides were a carousel, a toboggan chute, and the "Razzle-Dazzle".  About 1898 the menagerie closed and the owner of the Manhattan Hotel bought two monkeys from the zoo keeper. Much to his dismay, one of the monkeys set fire to the hotel. It was rebuilt the same year. The new Manhattan Hotel was a place for the latest fashions to be seen by the great crowds that would come from as far away as Mauch Chunk and Philadelphia to the park which had one of the biggest outdoor theaters in Pennsylvania.

In addition, Central Park hosted family reunions and picnics for businesses, clubs and churches.  A large sandbox for children provided enjoyment for the young family members while their older siblings played on the swings and enjoyed the rides.  Among the events held in the park was the baby parade.

When the Allentown-Kutztown Traction Company completed its trolley line from Allentown to Kutztown in 1899, the company added a stop at Dorney Park & Wildwater Kingdom, Central Park's competitor in the area.  However, Central Park held its own.  In 1922 the Manhattan Hotel was torn down and in its place the Manhattan Auditorium was built. An attempt was made in 1933 to establish the first supermarket in this area, but was unsuccessful. It was used for marathon dancing, later for auto shows, home shows, roller skating, to name a few. 

In 1946, the park was leased by the Transit Company to a private operator.

The park was closed in December 1951, after being destroyed by several fires, and the land was vacant for just over a decade.   In the early 1960s, it was sold for real estate development, and the last of Central Park was razed in 1964.  Today a few abandoned concrete footings remain in wooded areas intermixed between clearings and homes and buildings which now exist on the site.

See also
 List of historic places in Allentown, Pennsylvania

References

External links

 Remembering Central Park
  Central Park Website
  Photo-Archaeology in Central Park, Rittersville, PA
 Central Park

1893 establishments in Pennsylvania
Amusement parks in Pennsylvania
History of Allentown, Pennsylvania
Defunct amusement parks in Pennsylvania
Buildings and structures in Allentown, Pennsylvania
1951 disestablishments in Pennsylvania